Mistlur Records is a small record company founded in the 1970s. They are now owned by MNW. Amon the artist published by Mistlur is Trettioåriga Kriget, Mörbyligan, Ebba Grön, Lena Ekman, Travolta Kids, Calcutta Transfer, Torkel Rasmusson,  Diestinct, Raketerna, Lolita Pop, Imperiet, Richard Lloyd, Captain Beefheart, Docenterna and Fläskkvartetten. The label issued records from 1978 to 2010.

References

External links 
 

Swedish record labels